Gabula (died 1681) of the Manchu Hešeri clan was a duke and military general during the Qing Dynasty. He was Empress Xiaochengren's father, maternal grandfather of the crown prince Yinreng, and son of Sonin (duke of the First Rank, one of the Four Regents of the Kangxi Emperor).

Qing dynasty politicians
Manchu politicians
Manchu Plain Yellow Bannermen
Hešeri clan